Akkarapacha is a 1972 Indian Malayalam film, directed by M. M. Nesan and produced by M. M. Nesan/Sukumaran. The film stars Sathyan, Jayabharathi, Kaviyoor Ponnamma and Sunil in the lead roles. The film had musical score by G. Devarajan.

Cast

Sathyan as Vasudevan
Jayabharathi as Janamma
Kaviyoor Ponnamma as Bhageerathi
Sujatha as Devaki
Sunil as Vijayan
T. R. Omana as Mariya
Paul Vengola as Flirt 
Adoor Bhavani as Naaniyamma
Alummoodan as Chellappan
Bahadoor as Shivankutty
Changanacherry Thankam
K. P. Ummer as Bhaskaran
Kollam Lalitha as Sarasamma
N. Govindankutty as Bhargavan
Pala Thankam as Saraswathi
Puthuval as Pappu
Ramankutty Menon as Kochachan
Usha as Chellamma
Vanchiyoor Radha as Janaki
Baby Indira as Anandavally

Soundtrack

References

External links
 

1972 films
1970s Malayalam-language films